Ilene is an unincorporated community in Washington Township, Greene County, Indiana.

Ilene was the name of the daughter of an area resident.

Geography

References

Unincorporated communities in Greene County, Indiana
Unincorporated communities in Indiana